John K. Love is a retired United States Marine lieutenant general who last served as senior United States military representative to the NATO in Brussels. He is the former commanding officer of the Second Marine Division which is based in the Marine Corps Base Camp Lejeune, in North Carolina.

Military career
Love graduated from Texas Tech University. After, he was a corporal in the Marine Reserves and, in 1984, he was commissioned. He participated in Operation Iraqi Freedom in 2009. His assignments as a general officer included the time he participated in Operation Unified Protector in 2011 as part of NATO. Love was nominated for promotion to major general by the Secretary of Defense, Ash Carter, which was approved by the United States Senate in March 2015.

In June 2018, Love was nominated for promotion to lieutenant general and assignment as a military representative to the NATO Military Committee.

Awards and decorations
Love was awarded the Legion of Merit for "exceptionally meritorious conduct in the performance of outstanding services to the Government of the United States".

References

Year of birth missing (living people)
Living people
Texas Tech University alumni
United States Marine Corps officers
United States Marine Corps personnel of the Iraq War
United States Marine Corps generals
Place of birth missing (living people)